Storage management  usually refers to the management of computer data storage, which includes memory management. It can also refer to specific methods or products for storage management, such as the following
 ADSTAR Distributed Storage Manager
 Automatic Storage Management
 Hierarchical storage management
 IBM Tivoli Storage Manager
 OpenView Storage Area Manager
 Storage Management Initiative - Specification
 Storage Resource Manager
 Storage Resource Management